Toutant Airport , is located in Woodstock, Connecticut, United States.

Facilities and aircraft
Toutant Airport is situated six miles northwest of the central business district of Putnam, Connecticut, and contains one runway.  The runway, 17/35, is asphalt measuring 1756 x 60 ft (535 x 18 m). 

For the 12-month period ending April 30, 2015, the airport had 200 aircraft operations, an average of 200 per year: 40% local general aviation, and 60% transient general aviation. At that time there were 4 aircraft based at this airport: 25% single-engine, 50% helicopter, and 25% ultralight.

References

Airports in Connecticut
Putnam, Connecticut
Transportation buildings and structures in Windham County, Connecticut